The United States District Court for the Western District of Louisiana (in case citations, W.D. La.) is a United States federal court with jurisdiction over approximately two thirds of the state of Louisiana, with courts in Alexandria, Lafayette, Lake Charles, Monroe, and Shreveport. These cities comprise the Western District of Louisiana.

Appeals from the Western District of Louisiana are taken to the United States Court of Appeals for the Fifth Circuit (except for patent claims and claims against the U.S. government under the Tucker Act, which are appealed to the Federal Circuit).

Jurisdiction 
The parishes that fall under the jurisdiction of this district court are:

 Acadia Parish
 Allen Parish
 Avoyelles Parish
 Beauregard Parish
 Bienville Parish
 Bossier Parish
 Caddo Parish

 Calcasieu Parish
 Caldwell Parish
 Cameron Parish
 Catahoula Parish
 Claiborne Parish
 Concordia Parish
 DeSoto Parish

 East Carroll Parish
 Evangeline Parish
 Franklin Parish
 Grant Parish
 Iberia Parish
 Jackson Parish
 Jefferson Davis Parish

 Lafayette Parish
 LaSalle Parish
 Lincoln Parish
 Madison Parish
 Morehouse Parish
 Natchitoches Parish
 Ouachita Parish

 Rapides Parish
 Red River Parish
 Richland Parish
 Sabine Parish
 Saint Landry Parish
 Saint Martin Parish
 Saint Mary Parish

 Tensas Parish
 Union Parish
 Vermilion Parish
 Vernon Parish
 Webster Parish
 West Carroll Parish
 Winn Parish

History 
On March 26, 1804, Congress organized the Territory of Orleans and created the United States District Court for the District of Orleans – the only time Congress provided a territory with a district court equal in its authority and jurisdiction to those of the states. The District was thereafter subdivided and reformed several times.

Current judges 
:

Vacancies and pending nominations

Former judges

Chief judges

Succession of seats

U.S. attorneys 
The complete list of United States attorneys in Louisiana, including those who served during territorial status:

 James Brown (1805–1808)
 Philip Grymes (1808–1810)
 Tully Robinson (1810–1811)
 John Randolph Grymes (1811–1814)
 Tully Robinson (2) (1814)
 John Dick (1814–1821)
 John W. Smith (1821–1823)
 John Brownson (1823–1830)
 Benjamin F. Linton (1830–1841)
 Henderson Taylor (1841–1842)
 Caleb L. Swayze (1842–1849)
 Henry Boyce (1849–1850)
 Lawrence P. Crain (1850–1853)
 Joseph H. Kilpatrick (1853–1854)
 Peter Alexander (1854–1856)
 Claiborne C. Briscoe (1856)
 Floyd Walton (1856–1860)
 Leon D. Marks (1860)
 James R. Beckwith (1870)
 H. B. Talliaferro (1881)
 Milton C. Elstner (1881–1885)
 Montfort S. Jones (1885–1889)
 Milton C. Elstner (2) (1889–1893)
 Charles W. Seals (1893–1898)
 Milton C. Elstner (3) (1898–1910)
 Edward H. Randolph (1910–1913)
 George W. Jack (1913–1917)
 Robert A. Hunter (1917)
 Joseph Moore (1917–1921)
 Yandell Boatner (1921)
 Hugh C. Fisher (1921–1922)
 Philip H. Mecom (1922–1935)
 Benjamin F. Roberts (1935–1937)
 Harvey Fields (1937–1941)
 Malcolm Lafargue (1941–1950)
 Joseph J. Fleniken (1950)
 Harvey Locke Carey (1950)
 William J. Fleniken (1950–1953)
 Thomas Wilson (1953–1962)
 Edward L. Shaheen (1962–1969)
 Donald Ellsworth Walter (1969–1977)
 Edward L. Shaheen (2) (1977–1979)
 J. Ransdell Keene (1979–1981)
 Joseph S. Cage Jr. (1981–1993)
 Michael D. Skinner (1993–2000)
 William J. Flanagan (2000–2001)
 Donald W. Washington (2001–2010)
 William J. Flanagan (2) (2010)
 Stephanie A. Finley (2010–2017)
 Alexander C. Van Hook (2017–2018)
 David C. Joseph (2018–2020)
 Alexander C. Van Hook (2) (2020–2021)
 Brandon B. Brown (2021–present)

See also 
 Courts of Louisiana
 List of current United States district judges
 List of United States federal courthouses in Louisiana
 United States District Court for the Eastern District of Louisiana
 United States District Court for the Middle District of Louisiana
 United States Court of Appeals for the Fifth Circuit

References

External links 
 Official Website of the United States District Court for the Western District of Louisiana
 United States Attorney's Office, Western District of Louisiana

Louisiana, Western District
Louisiana law
Alexandria, Louisiana
Lafayette, Louisiana
Lake Charles, Louisiana
Monroe, Louisiana
Shreveport, Louisiana
Courthouses in Louisiana
1823 establishments in Louisiana
1845 disestablishments in Louisiana
1849 establishments in Louisiana
1866 disestablishments in Louisiana
1881 establishments in Louisiana
Courts and tribunals established in 1823
Courts and tribunals disestablished in 1845
Courts and tribunals established in 1849
Courts and tribunals disestablished in 1866
Courts and tribunals established in 1881